Mineral deficiency is a lack of the dietary minerals, the micronutrients that are needed for an organism's proper health. The cause may be a poor diet, impaired uptake of the minerals that are consumed, or a dysfunction in the organism's use of the mineral after it is absorbed. These deficiencies can result in many disorders including anemia and goitre. Examples of mineral deficiency include, zinc deficiency, iron deficiency, and magnesium deficiency.

Individual Mineral Deficiency

See also
Mineral (nutrient)
Micronutrient deficiency
Vitamin deficiency

References

External links 

Mineral deficiencies